This is a list of political scandals in the United Kingdom in chronological order. Scandals implicating political figures or governments of the UK, often reported in the mass media, have long had repercussions for their popularity. Issues in political scandals have included alleged or proven financial and sexual matters, or various other allegations or actions taken by politicians that led to controversy. In British media and political discourse, such scandals have sometimes been referred to as political sleaze since the 1990s. Notable scandals include the Marconi scandal, Profumo affair and the 2009 expenses scandal.

1890s
Liberator Building Society scandal, in which the Liberal Party MP Jabez Balfour was exposed as running several fraudulent companies to conceal financial losses. Balfour fled to Argentina, but was eventually arrested and imprisoned.

1910s 
 Marconi scandal of insider trading by Liberal Party Ministers including:
 Rufus Isaacs, 1st Marquess of Reading, the Attorney General
 The Master of Elibank, Lord Murray, the Treasurer of the Liberal Party,
 David Lloyd George, 1st Earl Lloyd-George of Dwyfor, the Chancellor of the Exchequer
Herbert Samuel, 1st Viscount Samuel, Postmaster General; was falsely implicated. (1912)
Shell Crisis of 1915, which led to the fall of H. H. Asquith's Liberal Party government during World War I.

1920s 
Lloyd George and the honours scandal. Honours sold for large campaign contributions (1922)
 Zinoviev Letter (1924)

1930s 
 Jimmy Thomas budget leak (1936)

1940s 
 Hugh Dalton budget leak (1947)
 John Belcher corruptly influenced – led to Lynskey Tribunal

1950s 
 Crichel Down and the resignation of Thomas Dugdale (1954)
 Suez Crisis (1956)

1960s 
 Vassall affair (1963): civil servant John Vassall, working for Minister Tam Galbraith, was revealed to be a spy for the Soviet Union and was arrested. The affair was investigated in the Vassall tribunal.
 Profumo affair (1963): Secretary of State for War John Profumo had an affair with Christine Keeler (to whom he had been introduced by artist Stephen Ward) who was having an affair with a Soviet spy at the same time.
 The Robert Boothby (Tory), Tom Driberg (Labour), Kray brothers affair and consequent cover-up involving senior politicians of both parties.  The Daily Mirror published some details of the matter and was falsely sued for libel.

1970s 
 Corrupt architect John Poulson and links to Conservative Home Secretary Reginald Maudling, Labour council leader T. Dan Smith and others (1972–1974): Maudling resigned, Smith sentenced to imprisonment.
 Earl Jellicoe and Lord Lambton sex scandal (1973): Conservatives, junior defence minister Lambton is arrested for using prostitutes and Cabinet minister Jellicoe also confesses.
 Labour MP John Stonehouse's faked suicide (1974)
 Harold Wilson's Prime Minister's Resignation Honours (known satirically as the "Lavender List") gives honours to a number of wealthy businessmen whose principles were considered antipathetic to those held by the Labour Party (May 1976)
 Peter Jay's appointment as British Ambassador to the US by his father in law, the then Labour Prime Minister James Callaghan. At the time Jay was a journalist with little diplomatic experience. (1976)
"Rinkagate": the Thorpe affair. Liberal Party leader Jeremy Thorpe was arrested and tried for allegedly paying a hitman to murder his lover, model Norman Scott, while walking his dog on Exmoor; the hitman only shot the dog, Rinka. Thorpe was forced to resign due to his clandestine gay affairs, but was acquitted of conspiracy to murder.

1980s 
 Joseph Kagan, Baron Kagan, earlier ennobled by the Labour Prime Minister Harold Wilson's notorious Lavender List (1976), was convicted of fraud (1980)
 Cecil Parkinson affair with secretary Sara Keays resulting in their child, Flora Keays (1983)
 Al Yamamah contract alleged to have been obtained by bribery (1985)
 Westland affair (1986): The Defence Secretary, Michael Heseltine resigned from his Cabinet job in a disagreement with Prime Minister Margaret Thatcher over the Westland affair. Heseltine walked out of a meeting at Number 10 as his views on the future of the Westland helicopter company were being ignored at the time.
 Jeffrey Archer and the prostitute allegations (1986), and his subsequent conviction for perjury (2001)
Westminster cemeteries scandal (1987)
 Edwina Currie resigns as a junior Health minister after claiming that millions of British eggs were infected with salmonella, stating that "most of [British] egg production" was infected (1988) 
 "Homes for votes" gerrymandering scandal (1987–1989)

1990s 
 Arms-to-Iraq and the closely connected Iraqi Supergun affair (1990)
 David Mellor resignation after press disclosure of his affair with Antonia de Sancha and gratis holiday from a daughter of a PLO official (1992)
 Michael Mates gift of a watch ("Don't let the bastards grind you down") to Asil Nadir (1993)
 Monklandsgate dominated the 1994 Monklands East by-election. It mainly consisted of allegations of sectarian spending discrepancies between Protestant Airdrie and Catholic Coatbridge, fuelled by the fact that all 17 of the ruling Labour group were Roman Catholics. (1994)
 Back to Basics, a government policy slogan portrayed by opponents and the press as a morality campaign to compare it with a contemporaneous succession of sex scandals in John Major's government which led to the resignation of Tim Yeo and the Earl of Caithness, among others (1994)
 Cash-for-questions affair involving Neil Hamilton, Tim Smith and Mohamed Al-Fayed (1994)
 Jonathan Aitken and the Paris Ritz Hotel bill allegations, and his subsequent conviction for perjury after his failed libel action against The Guardian, resulting in Aitken being only the third person to have to resign from the Privy Council in the 20th century. (1995)
 Conservative MP Jerry Hayes was "outed" as a homosexual by the News of the World with the headline "TORY MP 2-TIMED WIFE WITH UNDER-AGE GAY LOVER". Hayes had met Young Conservative Paul Stone at the 1991 Conservative conference and that same evening, "committed a lewd act which was in breach of the law at the time". Stone had been 18 at the time, whilst the legal age for homosexual sex in 1991 was 21. He had previously supported Section 28 and other anti-gay legislation. (1997)
 Bernie Ecclestone was involved in a political scandal when it transpired he had given the Labour Party a million pound donation – which raised eyebrows when the incoming Labour government changed its policy to allow Formula One to continue being sponsored by tobacco manufacturers. The Labour Party returned the donation when the scandal came to light. (1997)
Peter Mandelson, Trade and Industry Secretary, resigned after failing to disclose £373,000 loan from Paymaster General Geoffrey Robinson. (1998)
 Ron Davies resigned from the cabinet after being robbed by a man he met at Clapham Common (a well-known gay cruising ground) and then lying about it (1998)

2000s 
 Officegate (2001). Henry McLeish, Labour First Minister of Scotland, failed to refund the House of Commons for income he had received from the sub-let of his constituency office in Glenrothes while still a Westminster MP.
 Keith Vaz, Peter Mandelson and the Hinduja brothers. Mandelson forced to resign for a second time due to misleading statements. (2001)
 Jo Moore, within an hour of the September 11 attacks, sent an email to the press office of her department suggesting: "It's now a very good day to get out anything we want to bury. Councillors' expenses?" Although prior to the catastrophic collapse of the towers, the phrase "a good day to bury bad news" (not actually used by Moore) has since been used to refer to other instances of attempting to hide one item of news behind a more publicised issue.
Betsygate (2002), which revolved around the level of pay that Iain Duncan Smith's wife Elisabeth received as his diary secretary.
 In 2002, Edwina Currie revealed that she had had an affair, beginning in 1984, with John Major before he became Prime Minister of the United Kingdom. This was criticised as Major had frequently pushed his Back To Basics agenda (see above), which was taken by the media as a form of moral absolutism.
 The Burrell affair – allegations about the behaviour of the British royal family and their servants with possible constitutional implications. (2002)
 Ron Davies stood down from the Welsh assembly following accusations of illicit gay sex. Davies had claimed he had been badger-watching in the area. (2003)
 The apparent suicide of Dr. David Kelly and the Hutton Inquiry. On 17 July 2003, Kelly, an employee of the Ministry of Defence, apparently committed suicide after being misquoted by BBC journalist Andrew Gilligan as saying that Tony Blair's Labour government had knowingly "sexed up" the "September Dossier", a report into Iraq and weapons of mass destruction. The government was cleared of wrongdoing, while the BBC was strongly criticised by the subsequent inquiry, leading to the resignation of the BBC's chairman and director-general.
In April 2004, Beverly Hughes was forced to resign as minister for Immigration, Citizenship and Counter Terrorism when it was shown that she had been informed of procedural improprieties concerning the granting of visas to certain categories of workers from Eastern Europe. She had earlier told the House of Commons that if she had been aware of such facts she would have done something about it.
In 2005, David McLetchie, leader of the Scottish Conservatives, was forced to resign after claiming the highest taxi expenses of any MSP. These included personal journeys, journeys related solely with his second job as a solicitor, and Conservative Party business, for example travel to Conservative conferences. Conservative backbench MSP Brian Monteith had the whip withdrawn for briefing against his leader to the Scotland on Sunday newspaper.
Liberal Democrats Home Affairs spokesman Mark Oaten resigned after it was revealed by the News of the World that he paid rentboys to perform sexual acts on him.
David Mills financial allegations (2006). Tessa Jowell, Labour cabinet minister, was embroiled in a scandal about a property remortgage allegedly arranged to enable her husband, David Mills, to realise £350,000 from an off-shore hedge fund, money he allegedly received as a gift following testimony he had provided for Silvio Berlusconi in the 1990s. Nicknamed by the press as "Jowellgate".
Cash for Honours (2006). In March 2006 it emerged that the Labour Party had borrowed millions of pounds in 2005 to help fund their general election campaign. While not illegal, on 15 March the Treasurer of the party, Jack Dromey stated publicly that he had neither knowledge of nor involvement in these loans and had only become aware when he read about it in the newspapers. A story was running at the time that Dr Chai Patel and others had been recommended for life peerages after lending the Labour party money. He called on the Electoral Commission to investigate the issue of political parties taking out loans from non-commercial sources.
 Following revelations about Dr Chai Patel and others who were recommended for peerages after lending the Labour party money, the Treasurer of the party, Jack Dromey said he had not been involved and did not know the party had secretly borrowed millions of pounds in 2005. He called on the Electoral Commission to investigate the issue of political parties taking out loans from non-commercial sources.
 Angus McNeil (2007). The married SNP MP who made the initial police complaint over the cash for honours scandal was forced to make an apology after it was revealed that in 2005 he had a "heavy petting" session with two teenage girls aged 17 and 18 in a hotel room at the same time his wife was pregnant with their third child.
News of the World royal phone hacking scandal
 In November 2007, it emerged that more than £400,000 had been accepted by the Labour Party from one person through a series of third parties, causing the Electoral Commission to seek an explanation. Peter Watt resigned as the General Secretary of the party the day after the story broke and was quoted as saying that he knew about the arrangement but had not appreciated that he had failed to comply with the reporting requirements.
On 24 January 2008, Peter Hain resigned his two cabinet posts (Secretary of State for Work and Pensions and Secretary of State for Wales) after the Electoral Commission referred donations to his Deputy Leadership campaign to the police.
Derek Conway (2008). The Conservative Party MP was found to have reclaimed salaries he had paid to his two sons who had in fact not carried out the work to the extent claimed. He was ordered to repay £16,918, suspended from the House of Commons for 10 days and removed from the party whip.
Cash for Influence (2009). Details of covertly recorded discussions with four Labour Party peers which their ability to influence legislation and the consultancy fees that they charged (including retainer payments of up to £120,000) were published by The Sunday Times.
United Kingdom parliamentary expenses scandal (2009). Widespread actual and alleged misuse of the permitted allowances and expenses claimed by Members of Parliament and attempts by MPs and peers to exempt themselves from Freedom of Information legislation.

2010s

2010 
 The Iris Robinson scandal in which First Minister of Northern Ireland Peter Robinson stepped aside for six weeks in January 2010 following revelations of his wife's involvement in an extramarital affair, her attempted suicide, and allegations that he had failed to properly declare details of loans she had procured for her lover to develop a business venture.
 Red Sky scandal, involving contracts given to company Red Sky by the Northern Ireland Housing Executive.
 The 2010 cash for influence scandal, in which undercover reporters for the Dispatches television series posed as political lobbyists offering to pay Members of Parliament to influence policy.
 On 29 May 2010 Chief Secretary to the Treasury David Laws resigned from the Cabinet and was referred to the Parliamentary Commissioner for Standards after The Daily Telegraph newspaper published details of Laws claiming around £40,000 in expenses on a second home owned by a secret partner between 2004 and 2009, whilst House of Commons rules have prevented MPs from claiming second home expenses on properties owned by a partner since 2006. By resigning Laws became the shortest serving Minister in modern British political history with less than 18 days' service as a Cabinet Minister.

2011 
 On 14 October 2011 Secretary of State for Defence Liam Fox resigned from the Cabinet after he "mistakenly allowed the distinction between [his] personal interest and [his] government activities to become blurred" over his friendship with Adam Werritty. (He again served as a cabinet minister under Theresa May.)
News International phone hacking scandal
 The Ed Balls document leak was exposed by the Daily Telegraph and showed that shadow chancellor Ed Balls was involved in a supposed plot known as 'Project Volvo' to oust Tony Blair as leader and replace him with Gordon Brown shortly after the 2005 election.

2012 
Conservative Party 'cash for access' scandal involving Peter Cruddas and Sarah Southern, March 2012.
In February 2012 Liberal Democrat MP Chris Huhne resigned from the Cabinet when he was charged with perverting the course of justice over a 2003 speeding case. His wife Vicky Pryce had claimed that she was driving the car, and accepted the licence penalty points on his behalf so that he could avoid being banned from driving. Huhne plead guilty at his trial, resigned as a member of parliament, and he and Pryce were sentenced to eight months in prison for perverting the course of justice.
 In April 2012, Conservative Party MP and Culture Secretary Jeremy Hunt came under pressure to resign as a result of his closeness to Rupert Murdoch's media empire and alleged corruption in dealing with Murdoch's bid for News Corporation's takeover of BSkyB.
 In October 2012, Andrew Mitchell resigned from his post as Chief Whip following allegations made about his conduct during an altercation with police at Downing Street on 19 September, the incident becoming known as "plebgate".

2013 
 In the 2013 Labour Party Falkirk candidate selection, which began following the announcement that the incumbent MP Eric Joyce was to step down at the 2015 general election, allegations were made on the significant infiltration of the selection process by the Unite trade union, the Labour Party's largest financial backer.

2014 
 In April 2014 Maria Miller, the Culture Secretary, resigned following pressure relating to the results of an investigation into her past expenses claims.
 On 20 November 2014 Emily Thornberry resigned her shadow cabinet position shortly after polls closed in the Rochester and Strood by-election. Earlier in the day, she had received criticism after tweeting a photograph of a house in the constituency adorned with three flags of St. George and the owner's white van parked outside on the driveway, under the caption "Image from #Rochester", provoking accusations of snobbery. She was criticised by fellow Labour Party MPs, including leader Ed Miliband who said her tweet conveyed a "sense of disrespect".
 Namagate, involving allegations that First Minister of Northern Ireland Peter Robinson may have financially benefitted from a deal with National Asset Management Agency (NAMA).

2015 
 In September 2015, Lord Ashcroft published a biography of David Cameron, which suggested that the then Prime Minister took drugs regularly and performed an "outrageous initiation ceremony" which involved inserting "a private part of his anatomy" into the mouth of a dead pig during his time in university. This became known as "piggate". It also led to questions about the Prime Minister's honesty with party donors' known tax statuses as Lord Ashcroft suggested he had openly discussed his non-domiciled status with him in 2009, earlier than previously thought.

2016 
There have been several allegations of unlawful campaigning in the 2016 EU referendum, in addition to some allegations of Russian interference.
Stewart Hosie, Deputy Leader of the SNP and MP for Dundee East, resigned as Deputy Leader after it was reported he had been cheating on his wife, Cabinet Secretary for Health, Wellbeing and Sport in the Scottish Government, Shona Robison MSP. He had been having an affair with Westminster journalist Serena Cowdy.

2017 
 In 2017 the contaminated blood scandal, in which many haemophiliacs died from infected Factor medicine, hit the headlines and Parliament with allegations of a "industrial scale" criminal cover-up. MP Ken Clarke retracted remarks from his autobiography relating to the scandal and a public inquiry is now underway.
 The Renewable Heat Incentive scandal in Northern Ireland, in which Arlene Foster set up a green energy scheme but failed to introduce cost controls, creating perverse incentives which eventually led to a £480m bill to the Northern Ireland budget. There were allegations that members of the Democratic Unionist Party attempted to postpone the closure of the scheme, which gave way to a spike in applications and causing the public purse millions of pounds. In January 2017, the scandal caused the resignation of the deputy First Minister, Martin McGuinness, after Foster refused to stand aside as First Minister pending an investigation, collapsing the Executive Office and triggering an early election of the Northern Ireland Assembly. The resulting political rifts meant the Assembly did not meet again until 2020.
 The 2017 Westminster sexual misconduct allegations in which a number of MPs, MSPs, AMs, and other political figures were accused of sexual harassment and assault.

2018 
 The 2018 Windrush scandal, involving members of the Windrush generation being wrongly detained, deported, or threatened with deportation which caused the resignation of then Home Secretary, Amber Rudd.
Jeremy Hunt property scandal – In April 2018, The Daily Telegraph reported that Hunt breached anti-money laundering legislation by failing to declare his 50% interest in a property firm. The Guardian reported that Hunt was able to buy seven luxury flats at Alexandra Wharf, Southampton, with the help of a bulk discount from property developer and Conservative donor Nicholas James Roach.
 Several links between Cambridge Analytica and high-profile donors to both the Conservative Party and the Leave.EU campaign resulted in a scandal.
In December 2018 Labour MP Fiona Onasanya was convicted of perverting the course of justice for lying to police to avoid a speeding fine. She was expelled from her party and in January 2019 she was imprisoned for three months. Onasanya refused to resign as an MP, making her the first sitting MP to be imprisoned in 28 years. She was subsequently recalled by petition, the first MP to be removed by this process since it was introduced in 2015.

2019 
 The 2019 British prorogation controversy, whereby Prime Minister Boris Johnson unlawfully prorogued parliament, allegedly to avoid parliamentary scrutiny before the UK's scheduled departure from the European Union.

2020s

2020 
 The Dominic Cummings scandal, where Dominic Cummings, chief strategist of Prime Minister Boris Johnson, broke COVID-19 pandemic restrictions during the UK's first nationwide lockdown while experiencing symptoms of the disease. Cummings and Johnson rejected calls for the former to resign. It was suggested that the scandal undermined the public's compliance with pandemic restrictions.
In 2020, Home Secretary Priti Patel was found in a Cabinet Office inquiry to have broken ministerial code following several allegations of bullying civil servants. Prime Minister Boris Johnson rejected the findings of the inquiry and expressed his support for Patel, leading to independent advisor on ministerial standards Alex Allan to resign in protest.
 A number of contracts related to the COVID-19 pandemic have been criticised for alleged cronyism as the typical procurement procedures have not been required due to emergency powers granted to respond to the pandemic. Health Secretary Matt Hancock was ruled to have acted unlawfully by a High Court judge in relation to PPE contracts.
 The Alex Salmond scandal concerned how the Scottish Government, led by incumbent First Minister of Scotland Nicola Sturgeon, breached its own guidelines in its investigation into the harassment claims against Sturgeon's predecessor as First Minister, Alex Salmond. The Scottish Government lost a judicial review into their actions and had to pay over £500,000 to Salmond for legal expenses. Salmond claimed that senior figures in Sturgeon's government and the ruling Scottish National Party (SNP) conspired against him for political reasons. Critics accused Sturgeon of breaking the Ministerial Code which resulted in calls for her resignation. Sturgeon disputed the allegations, arguing that while mistakes had been made, her government acted appropriately.

2021 
 Matt Hancock was found to have acted unlawfully when his department did not reveal details of contracts it had signed during the COVID-19 pandemic, in legal action taken by the Good Law Project and MPs Debbie Abrahams, Caroline Lucas and Layla Moran.
 The Greensill scandal, where former Prime Minister David Cameron approached a number of government ministers on behalf of Greensill Capital to lobby for the company to receive Covid Corporate Financing Facility loans.
 The Sun published pictures and then video of leaked CCTV footage from inside the Department of Health of Health Secretary Matt Hancock and Gina Coladangelo kissing in a breach of COVID-19 social distancing guidance. Boris Johnson accepted Matt Hancock's apology and stated that he "considers the matter closed", however the Health Secretary resigned the following day.
Conservative MP Owen Paterson resigned from the House of Commons on 5 November 2021 amid controversy surrounding a report by the Parliamentary Commissioner for Standards that found that he had broken paid advocacy rules.
Partygate, or 'Westminster lockdown parties controversy' involving social gatherings by Downing Street and Conservative Party staff during COVID-19 restrictions in late 2020. Beergate was a similar scandal involving Labour Leader Keir Starmer.
Claudia Webbe, the Labour MP for Leicester East, was convicted of one charge of harassment in October 2021 and was given a suspended prison sentence. She was expelled from the Labour Party, which called for her to resign as an MP.

2022 
 Chris Pincher scandal. Chris Pincher, the Deputy Chief Whip of the Conservative Party, resigned on 30th June following allegations about him groping two men. Further allegations of harassment emerged against Pincher, along with claims that Prime Minister Boris Johnson had already been informed of his behaviour.  The incremental effect of this and other recent controversies led to the resignation of 59 Conservative politicians, most notably Rishi Sunak as Chancellor and Sajid Javid as Health Secretary. This in turn, led to Boris Johnson committing to resign as leader of the Conservative Party, and thus as prime minister, when his replacement as leader had been chosen by his party.

2023 

 Lockdown Files. The Daily Telegraph obtained containing evidence, analysis, speculation, comment, and opinion relating to more than 100,000 WhatsApp messages obtained from former health secretary Matt Hancock that were leaked to them by journalist Isabel Oakeshott.

References

 
United Kingdom
United Kingdom politics-related lists
Political scandals